Jhonatan Rojas Restrepo (born 8 June 1988) is a Colombian football player who  currently plays for Cypriot First Division Club AEZ Zakakiou, as an attacking midfielder or striker, although he also can play as left back.

References

External links
 Jhonatan Rojas at playmakerstats.com (English version of calciozz.it)
 

1988 births
Living people
Colombian footballers
Colombian expatriate footballers
Expatriate footballers in Spain
Expatriate footballers in England
Expatriate footballers in Cyprus
Deportivo Pereira footballers
Real Sociedad footballers
Deportivo Alavés B players
Harrow Borough F.C. players
Apollon Limassol FC players
AEZ Zakakiou players
Association football midfielders
People from Pereira, Colombia